The North Star (also known as Armored Attack in the US) is a 1943 pro-resistance war film starring Anne Baxter, Dana Andrews, Walter Huston, Walter Brennan and Erich von Stroheim  It was produced by Samuel Goldwyn Productions and distributed by RKO Radio Pictures. It was directed by Lewis Milestone, written by Lillian Hellman and featured production design by William Cameron Menzies. The music was written by Aaron Copland, the lyrics by Ira Gershwin, and the cinematography was by James Wong Howe. The film also marked the debut of Farley Granger.

The film is about the resistance of Ukrainian villagers, through guerrilla tactics, against the German invaders of the Ukrainian SSR. The film was unashamed pro-Soviet propaganda at the height of the war.

In the 1950s, it was criticized for this reason and it was re-cut to remove the idealized portrayal of Soviet collective farms at the beginning and to include references to the Hungarian Uprising of 1956. The film was then retitled Armored Attack and released to American theatres, where it begins with the arrival of the Germans in the town and continues through the scenes of the uprising,  with a narration tacked on praising the Hungarian Uprising of 1956.

Plot

In June 1941, Ukrainian villagers are living in peace. As the school year ends, a group of friends decide to travel to Kiev for a holiday. To their horror, they find themselves attacked by German aircraft, part of the Nazi invasion of the Soviet Union. Eventually their village itself is occupied by the Nazis. Meanwhile, men and women take to the hills to form partisan militias.

The full brutality of the Nazis is revealed when the Germans send Dr. von Harden to use the village children as a source of blood for transfusions into wounded German soldiers. Some children lose so much blood that they die. When Dr. Pavel Kurin, a famous Ukrainian doctor, discovers this and informs the partisans, they prepare to strike back. They launch a cavalry assault on the village to rescue their families. Kurin accuses von Harden of being worse than the ardent Nazis, because he has used his skills to support them. He then shoots him. The peasants join together, and one girl envisions a future in which they will "make a free world for all men".

Cast

Criticism
The House Committee on Un-American Activities would later cite The North Star as one of the three noted examples of pro-Soviet works made by Hollywood, the other two  being Warner Brothers' Mission to Moscow (1943) and MGM's Song of Russia (1944). Similar U.S. World War II movies are RKO Radio Pictures's Days of Glory on Russian resistance in the Tula Oblast and MGM's Dragon Seed on Chinese efforts against the Japanese occupation.

The extent to which the film incorporated official Soviet propaganda about collective farms prompted British anti-communist writer Robert Conquest, a member of the British Foreign Office's Information Research Department (an anti-communist propaganda unit) in the 1950s, to later write "a travesty greater than could have been shown on Soviet screens to audiences used to lies, but experienced in [collective-farm conditions] to a degree requiring at least a minimum of restraint".

Recut
The film was rereleased in 1957 under the title Armored Attack. This edited version opens with the entry of a German column marching into a village and concludes with narration praising the Hungarian Uprising of 1956. It was released together with Fred Zinnemann's 1950 film The Men which was also renamed to Battle Stripe.

In later years, the original version was made available on home video restoring segments removed for the 1957 re-release.

Awards
The film was nominated for six Academy Awards:
 Art Direction (Black-and-White) (Perry Ferguson, Howard Bristol)
 Cinematography (Black-and-White) (James Wong Howe)
 Music (Music Score of a Dramatic or Comedy Picture) (Aaron Copland)
 Sound Recording (Thomas T. Moulton)
 Special Effects (Clarence Slifer, Ray Binger, Thomas T. Moulton)
 Writing (Original Screenplay) (Lillian Hellman)

References

External links 

 
 
 
 
 
 

1943 films
1943 war films
American war films
American pro-Soviet propaganda films
American black-and-white films
Eastern Front of World War II films
Films set in Ukraine
Films directed by Lewis Milestone
Films about the Soviet Union in the Stalin era
Samuel Goldwyn Productions films
Films with screenplays by Lillian Hellman
Films scored by Aaron Copland
World War II films based on actual events
1940s English-language films
1940s American films